Koca Katran (literally "big cedar") is a monumental old prickly cedar (Juniperus oxycedrus) in Mersin Province, southern Turkey. It is a registered natural monument of the country.

Nearest settlements are Arslanköy town and Tırtar village of Toroslar district in Mersin Province. Entrance to the valley, where the tree is situated, is barred, and access is subject to permission from the forestry authority.

The nameplate at site states the age of the cedar as 625 years old.

The old tree was registered a natural monument on September 27, 1994.

See also
 List of individual trees

References

Individual trees in Turkey
Natural monuments of Turkey
Mersin Province
Toroslar District